Canada is home to a wide variety of power stations (or generating stations). The lists below outline power stations of significance by type, or by the province/territory in which they reside.

By type
The following pages lists the power stations in Canada by type:
 List of largest power stations in Canada

 List of generating stations in Manitoba
 List of generating stations in New Brunswick
 List of generating stations in Newfoundland and Labrador
 List of generating stations in the Northwest Territories
 List of generating stations in Nova Scotia
 List of generating stations in Nunavut
 List of generating stations in Ontario
 List of generating stations in Prince Edward Island
 List of generating stations in Quebec
 List of generating stations in Saskatchewan
 List of generating stations in Yukon

See also
List of largest power stations in the world
List of power stations in the United States

Generating stations in Canada
Generating stations
 
Generating stations in Canada